Miguel Torruco Marqués (September 19, 1951 in Mexico City) is an entrepreneur, academic and Mexican public official. 
He was the Secretary of Tourism of the Federal District from 2012 to 2017. In 2017, he became a Tourism Adviser of Andrés Manuel López Obrador, president of National Regeneration Movement (MORENA).

Biography
He is the son of actress Maria Elena Marques and captain and actor Miguel Torruco Castellanos.
He holds a degree in hotel and restaurant management by the Mexican School of Tourism, which reached degree with the thesis titled "Mexican Association of Hotels and Motels as a fundamental tool for the consolidation of the sector."
In academia he served as professor and deputy director of the Mexican School of Tourism. A short time later, at age 25, he founded his own school, the Pan American Hotel School (HBS), forming 17,000 tourism professionals in 38 years of institutional life.

As rector of the institution he established, among other achievements, degrees in Hospitality, Catering and Tourism Business Administration and the Graduate and Master in Hospitality Management with official recognition, for the first time in Latin America.

He also demonstrated great leadership as President of the Alumni Associations of Tourism and the Mexican Academic Special Tourism (AMECAPT) centers, thus forging a solid foundation for entering the international level, since in 1991 he founded the Pan American Confederation of Schools of Hotel, Gastronomy and Tourism (CONPEHT), same that presided from this date to 1994 and represents the most prestigious educational institutions in 26 countries, from Canada to Argentina; also includes Spain.

Regarding his experience in the private sector, he began as "bell boy" to reach the General Deputy Manager of Hotel del Paseo in Mexico City. He served in two administrations as Vice President of Tourism of the National Confederation of National Chambers of Commerce, Services and Tourism, CONCANACO-Servytur.

He also took over as national president of the Mexican Association of Hotels and Motels for 2000–2004. Over these four years, he consolidated and unified organization going from 60 to 100 associations affiliates around the country, and even did transcend internationally to preside over and to found the Latin American Confederation of Hotels and Restaurants (Flahr) and also assume the Vice President for Latin America of the International Hotel and Restaurant Association (IHRA).

He became national president of the National Tourism Confederation (CNT), a coordinating body of tourism in Mexico, which groups 160 associations, unions, chambers, unions and organizations representing companies.
Since 2012, he is the Secretary of Tourism of the Federal District, after the Mayor of Mexico City, Miguel Angel Mancera, invited him to lead this sector in the Mexican capital.

In turn, he is Chairman of the Technical Committee of the Joint Tourism Promotion Fund of the Federal District, Chairman of the Consultative Group on Training of Human Resources for Tourism of the City of Mexico and member of the Group of Experts of the World Tourism Organization (OMT).

Books
He is the author of 9 books: 
Manual Hosting Technology I and II, 1976; 
ASA and its Link to Tourism, 1987; 
Tour 1987 services; 
Institutional History of Tourism in Mexico, 1926-1988, 1988; 
The Tourism Industry of Hope, 1990; 
Formation of Human Resources in Tourism (the case of Mexico), 2000; 
"The Association of Hotels and Motels, 90 years after its foundation (1922-2012)".

He has also written five diagnoses on tourism, highlighting "Formulation bases for the National Tourism Plan 1982-1988". In addition, he has lectured in 36 countries; and has received numerous awards throughout his 43 years of professional life.

References

External links
Secretaría de Turismo del Ciudad de México

1951 births
Living people
Cornell University alumni
21st-century Mexican politicians
Writers from Mexico City
20th-century Mexican writers
20th-century Mexican male writers
21st-century Mexican writers
Mexican Secretaries of Tourism
Morena (political party) politicians
Cabinet of Andrés Manuel López Obrador